Italy's invasion of Ethiopia can refer to:

 First Italo-Ethiopian War (1895–96)
 Second Italo-Ethiopian War (1935–36)